Lily Maria Phoebe Agg (born 17 December 1993) is a professional footballer for Women's Championship club London City Lionesses. Born in England, she is a member of the Republic of Ireland women's national team.

Agg studied at the University of Brighton and has got a teaching degree. Alongside her football career, Agg also currently works as a Sports Lecturer at Academy 1 Sports in Essex.

Early life 
Agg grew up in Eastbourne with her mother Ruth and three siblings. She attended Bishop Bell School and began playing youth football for Eastbourne Borough when she was five years old, before joining Polegate Grasshoppers when she was 11.

Club career

Arsenal 
After moving away from her home in the South East, Agg joined the academy of the most successful club in English women's football, Arsenal. She did manage to force her way into the first team squad, but made only a handful of appearances. She declined the offer of a full-time contract from Arsenal, preferring to prioritise her university studies.

Brighton & Hove Albion  
Instead Agg started her professional career back at her hometown club, Brighton & Hove Albion, which she had initially joined at the Under 12's level in Brighton Centre's of Excellence before moving to Arsenal.

London Bees 
In January 2014 Agg reluctantly left Brighton & Hove Albion, in order to play at a higher level. She returned to London, joining the Bees for a short period. She scored the club's first ever goal in their 3–1 FA Women's Cup win over Leeds United.

Millwall Lionesses 
She left the Bees after a very short spell to join the Millwall Lionesses for a season. She made a promising start, as the club's joint-leading goal scorer for 2014, and extended her contract for another year at the end of the campaign.

Return to Brighton & Hove Albion 
After a two-year period away, Lily rejoined her hometown club in 2015. During this spell she helped the club gain promotion, after winning the FA Women's Premier League Championship Play Off.

Cardiff Metropolitan Ladies F.C. 
Agg played for Cardiff Met. Ladies F.C., including during their 2016–17 UEFA Women's Champions League campaign, where she scored both goals in Cardiff's 3–2 loss to Spartak Subotica.

Bristol City 
Agg moved to Women's Super League side Bristol City in January 2017. She paused her teaching career in order to join her new club on a full-time basis. Making the move to England's top division is something that she has described as one of her greater career achievements. She made only three appearances, with one start, managing to find the net on one occasion at her time in the South West of England.

FFC Frankfurt 
In August 2017, Agg moved to the Frauen-Bundesliga to join FFC Frankfurt, after a successful trial. At the time, she was the only British player play in Germany and it was seen to be a step up in her career, joining such a decorated club.

FFC Frankfurt had won seven Frauen-Bundesliga's, eight German Cups and the Champions League on four occasions. Agg enjoyed playing in Germany, praising the professionalism of the club and the competitiveness of the Frauen-Bundesliga.

In her only season in Germany, the club managed an average 6th-placed finish. However, Agg struggled for game time, making only 13 appearances, with nine of them involving her coming on as a substitute. Her only goal came in a league defeat to Freiburg.

Charlton 
After a short stint in Germany, Agg joined Charlton for what was their inaugural season in the Championship. She made a total of six appearances and scored on two occasions on her return to English football.

London City Lionesses 
Agg subsequently joined Championship club London City Lionesses, ahead of the 2019–20 season. However, due to suffering a fractured tibia against Reading in a pre-season friendly, she missed the entirety of her debut season at the club.

She returned to action in the 2020–21 season against Sheffield United. In total, she made eleven appearances that season, being rewarded with three player of the match awards netting her one and only goal against champions Leicester.

International career 
On 19 June 2022, Agg made her debut for the Republic of Ireland women's national football team in a friendly against the Philippines in Antalya, Turkey. She marked the occasion by scoring the only goal in Ireland's 1–0 win. Agg had previously represented England up to under-19 level, but changed her allegiance to Ireland after an approach from the team's coach Vera Pauw. Agg was eligible for Ireland due to her grandmother Breda Greene being from County Cork, but the process of obtaining citizenship and switching her football eligibility proved to be protracted, delayed several times by injury and the COVID-19 pandemic in the Republic of Ireland.

On 1 September 2022 Agg was named player of the match in Ireland's 1–0 2023 FIFA Women's World Cup qualification – UEFA Group A win over Finland at Tallaght Stadium. She entered play as a first-half substitute for the injured Ruesha Littlejohn then headed the winning goal, which secured Ireland's place in the 2023 FIFA Women's World Cup qualification – UEFA play-offs.

International goals

References

External links
 Profile at London City Lionesses
 

1993 births
Living people
English women's footballers
Women's association football midfielders
Brighton & Hove Albion W.F.C. players
Arsenal W.F.C. players
London Bees players
Millwall Lionesses L.F.C. players
Bristol City W.F.C. players
Eintracht Frankfurt (women) players
Charlton Athletic W.F.C. players
London City Lionesses players
Women's Super League players
Women's Championship (England) players
Frauen-Bundesliga players
English expatriate women's footballers
English expatriate sportspeople in Germany
Expatriate women's footballers in Germany
Footballers from Brighton
English people of Irish descent
Republic of Ireland women's international footballers
Republic of Ireland women's association footballers
England women's youth international footballers